Stephen Ouimette is a Canadian actor and director. Although mostly known for his stage work, particularly at the Stratford Festival of Canada and recently on Broadway in La Bete, he achieved TV fame (and a Gemini Award) as the ghostly Oliver Welles in the drama Slings and Arrows. In 2006, he starred in the CanStage production of I Am My Own Wife.

He is most notable for providing the voice for Beetlejuice on the eponymous animated series. His other notable animation voice credits are Archangel in the X-Men and Pompadour in Babar.

Filmography
 Cardinal (2018) TV series (Dr. Bell)
 Squishy Squashy (2012) TV series (voice)
 Scaredy Squirrel (2011) TV Series (voice)
 Eleventh Hour (2008) TV Series (Rainer Todd)
 Grossology (2006) TV Series (voice) (Frederick Follicle)
 The Care Bears' Big Wish Movie (2005) (voice) (Too Loud Bear)
 Slings and Arrows (2003) TV Series (Oliver Welles)
 Roboroach (2002) TV Series (voice)
 Puppets Who Kill (2002) TV Series (voice) (Dr. Galileo)
 Trick or Treasure (2002) TV Series (Willie)
 I Was a Rat (2001) (mini) TV Series (Wheedle)
 Pecola (2001) TV Series (voice) (Mr. Saruyama)
 The Accuser (2000) TV Series (voice) (Barry Dinsmore)
 SillySox (TV series) (2000-05) (voice) (Donald (Seasons 4-6)
 Maggie and the Ferocious Beast (2000) TV Series (voice) (Beast)
 Anne of Green Gables: The Animated Series (2000) TV Series (voice) (Cartographer)
 Virtual Mom (2000) (TV) (Waiter)
 Murder Most Likely (1999) TV Series
 After Alice (1999) (Gideon Wood)
 Heater (1999) (The Man)
 The Iron Giant (1999) (voice) (Soldier)
 The Avengers: United They Stand (1999) TV Series (voice) (Nicholas Scratch)
 Blaster's Universe (1999) TV Series (voice) (Number Cruncher)
 The City (1999) TV Series (L'ecuyer #1)
 Mythic Warriors: Guardians of the Legend (1998) TV Series (voice) (Dionysus)
 Bob and Margaret (1998) TV Series (voice)
 Mentors (1998) TV Series (William Shakespeare)
 More Tears (1998) TV Series (Terry Gilmore)
 Franklin (1997) TV Series (voice) (Mr. Coyote)
 House (1995)
 Tales from the Cryptkeeper (1993) TV Series (voice) (Chuck)
 The Busy World of Richard Scarry  (1993) TV Series (voice) (Dr. Lion, Mr. Raccoon, additional voices)
 The Rosey and Buddy Show (1992) TV Series (voice) (Beetlejuice)
 X-Men (1992) TV Series (voice) (Warren Worthington III/Angel/Archangel, Cameron Hodge/Phalanx)
 Dog City (1992) TV Series (voice) (Mad Dog, Mayor Kickbark)
 The Trial of Red Riding Hood (1992) (TV) (The Boy Who Cried Wolf)
 The Adjuster (1991) (Larry The Butterfly Collector)
 Conspiracy of Silence (1991) (mini) TV Series
 Firing Squad (1991) (TV) (Capt. John Adam)
 Alligator Pie (1991) (TV) (Poetry reader)
 Destiny to Order (1990) (J.D. Baird)
 Babar: The Movie (1989) (voice) (Pompadour)
 Babar (1989) TV Series (voice) (Pompadour)
 Beetlejuice (1989) TV Series (voice) (Beetlejuice, Snugglejuice, Posijuice, Negajuice)
 The Top of His Head (1989) (Gus Victor)
 AlfTales (1988) TV Series (voice)
 ALF: The Animated Series (1988) TV Series (voice)
 A Nest of Singing Birds (1987)
 Street Legal (1987) TV Series (Walter, Sean McGillivray)
 The Campbells (1986) TV Series (Reverend Greener)
 In This Corner (1985) (TV) (as Steven Ouimette)

External links

Stratford bio of Ouimette
Canadian Theatre Encyclopedia bio of Ouimette

Living people
Canadian male voice actors
Dora Mavor Moore Award winners
Canadian male stage actors
Canadian male television actors
Canadian male film actors
Franco-Ontarian people
Canadian male Shakespearean actors
Best Supporting Actor in a Drama Series Canadian Screen Award winners
Year of birth missing (living people)